Matale electoral district is one of the 22 multi-member electoral districts of Sri Lanka created by the 1978 Constitution of Sri Lanka. The district is conterminous with the administrative district of Matale in the Central province. The district currently elects five of the 225 members of the Sri Lankan Parliament and had 342,684 registered electors in 2010.

1982 Presidential Election
Results of the 1st presidential election held on 20 October 1982 for the district:

1988 Presidential Election
Results of the 2nd presidential election held on 19 December 1988 for the district:

1989 Parliamentary General Election
Results of the 9th parliamentary election held on 15 February 1989 for the district:

The following candidates were elected:
Wijeratne Banda Jambugahapitiyagedera (UNP), 31,635 preference votes (pv); Alick Aluvihare (UNP), 31,004 pv; Basnayake Mudiyanselage Punchi Banda Kaviratne (UNP), 23,541 pv; V.G. Jinadasa (UNP), 22,941 pv; and Nandimithra Ekanayake (SLFP), 17,941 pv.

1993 Provincial Council Election
Results of the 2nd Central provincial council election held on 17 May 1993 for the district:

1994 Parliamentary General Election
Results of the 10th parliamentary election held on 16 August 1994 for the district:

The following candidates were elected:
Alick Aluvihare (UNP), 61,526 preference votes (pv); Janaka Bandara Tennakoon (PA), 52,437 pv; Nandimithra Ekanayake (PA), 51,919 pv; Gopallawa Moithra Kuda Banda (PA), 40,555 pv; and * Vidana Gamage Jinadasa (UNP), 35,474 pv.

1994 Presidential Election
Results of the 3rd presidential election held on 9 November 1994 for the district:

1999 Provincial Council Election
Results of the 3rd Central provincial council election held on 6 April 1999 for the district:

1999 Presidential Election
Results of the 4th presidential election held on 21 December 1999 for the district:

2000 Parliamentary General Election
Results of the 11th parliamentary election held on 10 October 2000 for the district:

The following candidates were elected:
Ranjith Aluvihare (UNP), 62,911 preference votes (pv); Alick Aluvihare (UNP), 60,419 pv; Janaka Bandara Tennakoon (PA), 42,366; Gopallawa Moithra Kuda Banda (PA), 40,397 pv; and Nandimithra Ekanayake (PA), 39,585 pv;

2001 Parliamentary General Election
Results of the 12th parliamentary election held on 5 December 2001 for the district:

The following candidates were elected:
Alick Aluvihare (UNF), 75,620 preference votes (pv); Ranjith Aluvihare (UNF), 72,553 pv; Janaka Bandara Tennakoon (PA), 49,959 pv; Mudiyanselage Sanjeeva Bandara Kaviratne (UNF), 37,226 pv; and Bandula S.B. Yalegama (PA), 35,450.

2004 Parliamentary General Election
Results of the 13th parliamentary election held on 2 April 2004 for the district:

The following candidates were elected:
Sujatha Alahakoon (UPFA-JVP), 57,234 preference votes (pv); Janaka Bandara Tennakoon (UPFA-SLFP), 54,711 pv; Ranjith Aluvihare (UNF-UNP), 47,152 pv; Alick Aluvihare (UNF-UNP), 39,649 pv; and Rohana Dissanayake (UPFA-SLFP), 37,091 pv.

Alick Aluvihare (UNF-UNP) died on 17 May 2009. His replacement Nandimithra Ekanayake (UNF-UNP) was sworn in on 9 June 2009.

2004 Provincial Council Election
Results of the 4th Central provincial council election held on 10 July 2004 for the district:

The following candidates were elected:
Aluwihare Wasantha (UNP), 33,364 preference votes (pv); Nandimithra Ekanayake (UNP), 27,731 pv; Amarasinghe Herath Bandaranayake Wasala Mudiyanselage Champaka Sugishwara Wijerathna (UPFA), 25,688 pv; Bandula S.B. Yalegama (UPFA), 24,270 pv; Warnakulasooiya Mudiyanselage Yasamana (UPFA), 23,637 pv; Gamagedara Dissanayake (UPFA), 23,216 pv; Thenne Gedara Sarath Wijesinghe (UPFA), 21,029 pv; L.D. Nimalasiri (UPFA), 18,954 pv;  Mudiyanselage Sanjeeva Bandara Kaviratne (UNP), 15,728 pv; and Ekanayaka Mudiyanselage Rohana Bandaranayake (UNP), 12,452 pv.

2005 Presidential Election
Results of the 5th presidential election held on 17 November 2005 for the district:

2009 Provincial Council Election
Results of the 5th Central provincial council election held on 14 February 2009 for the district:

The following candidates were elected:
Pramitha Tennakoon (UPFA), 49,665 preference votes (pv); Nandimithra Ekanayake (UPFA), 35,995 pv; Warnakulasooiya Mudiyanselage Yasamana (UPFA), 32,991 pv; Bandula S.B. Yalegama (UPFA), 30,878 pv; Aluwihare Wasantha (UNP), 28,855 pv; L.D. Nimalasiri (UPFA), 27,958 pv; D.M.P.K.B. Dissanayake (UPFA), 25,903 pv; Amarasinghe Herath Bandaranayake Wasala Mudiyanselage Champaka Sugishwara Wijerathna (UPFA), 25,754 pv; Mudiyanselage Sanjeeva Bandara Kaviratne (UNP), 15,845 pv; and Ekanayaka Mudiyanselage Rohana Bandaranayake (UNP), 13,341 pv.

2010 Presidential Election
Results of the 6th presidential election held on 26 January 2010 for the district:

2010 Parliamentary General Election
Results of the 14th parliamentary election held on 8 April 2010 for the district:

The following candidates were elected:
Lakshman Perera (UPFA), 65,077 preference votes (pv); Janaka Bandara Tennakoon (UPFA-SLFP), 47,133 pv; Nandimithra Ekanayake (UPFA), 35,754 pv; Rohana Dissanayake (UPFA-SLFP), 32,803 pv; and Wasantha Aluvihare (UNF), 31,529 pv.

References

Electoral districts of Sri Lanka
Politics of Matale District